Histone-lysine N-methyltransferase SETD7 is an enzyme that in humans is encoded by the SETD7 gene.

References

Further reading